Yoshihito Nishioka won the title, defeating Alexander Kudryavtsev in the final 6–3, 6–4.

Seeds

Draw

Finals

Top half

Bottom half

References 
 Main draw
 Qualifying draw

Dunlop World Challenge
2015 MS
2015 ATP Challenger Tour